Events in the year 1889 in Chile.

Incumbents
President: Jose Manuel Balmaceda
President of the Senate of Chile: Domingo Santa Maria, Adolfo Eastman

Events
founding of Enersis
founding of Falabella (retail store)
founding of S.A.C.I. Falabella

Births
January 10 - Gabriela Mistral, poet (died 1957)

Deaths
July 1 - Domingo Santa Maria

References

 
1880s in Chile
Years of the 19th century in Chile
Chile